Luliang County is a county under the administration of the prefecture-level city of Qujing, in the east of Yunnan province of southwestern China.

Administrative divisions
Luliang County has 2 subdistricts, 7 towns and 2 townships. 
2 subdistricts
 Zhongshu
 Tongle
7 towns

2 townships
 Huoshui
 Longhai

Climate

Flora and fauna
The type locality of Sinocyclocheilus lateristriatus, a cyprinid fish endemic to China, is in Luliang County. Similarly, Schuchertella luliangensis, a Permian brachiopod, has been described from the Kuangshan Formation in Luliang County (and named after the county).

In media
The county has obtained questionable visibility in international headlines after it emerged that the county government had presented data exaggerating the economic performance of the county.

References

External links
 Luliang County Official Website]

County-level divisions of Qujing